The Caledonia Regional League (currently named the Tennent's Caledonia League for sponsorship reasons) is one of three Regional Leagues operated by the Scottish Rugby Union (SRU), which play at a level below that of the National League structure. 

Historically, these divisions were district leagues under the jurisdiction of the North of Scotland Rugby Union and the Midlands District Rugby Union, but have now come under the auspices of the SRU. 

Winners of the top division progress to Scottish National League Division Three. Below Division One, the league is regionalised further into Midlands and North divisions.

Caledonia Regional League, 2021–22

2nd and 3rd XVs not included.

See also
East Regional League
West Regional League

Scottish Regional League (rugby union)
6